Major-General James Desmond Blaise "Des" Smith, CBE, DSO, KStJ, CD (2 October 1911 – 11 October 1991) was a senior Canadian Army officer active in World War II, fighting in the Italian Campaign and Northwest Europe.

Early life and military career
Smith was born in Ottawa, Ontario on 2 October 1911. He studied at the Royal Military College of Canada and graduated in 1933. On graduation he was promoted to lieutenant and attached to the Royal Canadian Dragoons. He served in the infantry, and was called overseas in 1940 as a staff officer with the 1st Canadian Infantry Division, then stationed in the United Kingdom. He became a brigadier in 1943 and commanded the 5th Canadian Armoured Brigade in both the Italian and Northwest Europe Campaigns. He returned to Canada in 1945, and took over command of the Royal Military College. During the 1950s, he commanded Canadian forces in Europe as part of NATO. He retired in 1962, to start work in the private sector, eventually moving to England. He retired in 1986, and died in London a few days after his 80th birthday in 1991.

World War II
Captain Smith's World War II overseas service began when the Royal Canadian Dragoons were sent to England, as part of the 1st Canadian Infantry Division. Smith earned his promotion from captain to major due to breaking the rules. He was ordered to get winter gear for troops that would be deployed in Norway. Finding nothing suitable, he just ordered proper gear from a company named Lilywhite's. Smith was summoned to appear before Major-General McNaughton because of the unauthorised expense; but instead of having to pay personally for the bill, he received a promotion. He ended his wartime career as Brigadier of the 1st Canadian Infantry Brigade.

Post-war military career
Between 1945 and his military retirement in 1962, Smith held several positions in Canada and the United Kingdom. His first peace time job was at his alma mater the Royal Military College. He commanded the college till 1947. In the period 1958–1962, Smith was Adjutant-General of the Canadian Army in Ottawa. In the meantime he held, amongst others, the position as chairman of the Canadian Joint Staff with the NATO. He was forced to leave the Army on Prime Minister John Diefenbaker's instance, due to an extra-marital affair that became public knowledge.

Post-war civil career
Smith moved to England in 1962. After several minor jobs he joined Pillar Holdings in 1964. He was responsible for the engineering branch of that company: Pillar Engineering Limited. In 1986 he retired from his civil job, only to be appointed as the first Canadian member of the Commonwealth War Graves Commission.

Personal
Smith was married twice, first Miriam Blackburn, until her death in 1969, and then to Belle Shenkman, a member of the Order of Canada. He had two sons from his first marriage, James and Stephen George Smith. He died in a hospital in London, England on 11 October 1991. There was first a memorial in London, and then a state funeral in Canada's capital city, Ottawa.

Senior military positions held

References

External links
Generals of World War II
Hall of Valour

1911 births
1991 deaths
Military personnel from Ottawa
Canadian generals
Canadian Commanders of the Order of the British Empire
Canadian Companions of the Distinguished Service Order
Canadian Militia officers
Canadian Army officers
Royal Military College of Canada alumni
Commandants of the Royal Military College of Canada
Canadian expatriates in the United Kingdom
Canadian Army personnel of World War II
Graduates of the Staff College, Camberley
Royal Canadian Dragoons officers
Burials at Beechwood Cemetery (Ottawa)